Daddy's Home is a 2015 American buddy comedy film directed by Sean Anders and written by Anders, Brian Burns, and John Morris. The film is about a mild-mannered stepfather (Will Ferrell) who vies for the attention of his wife's (Linda Cardellini) children when their biological father (Mark Wahlberg) returns.

The second collaboration between Ferrell and Wahlberg following the 2010 film The Other Guys, principal photography began on November 17, 2014 in New Orleans, Louisiana. The film was released on December 25, 2015, by Paramount Pictures and grossed $242 million worldwide, becoming Ferrell's highest-grossing live-action film.  It has a 30% approval rating on Rotten Tomatoes, which criticizes the lack of funny ideas and not fully exploring the premise. A sequel, Daddy's Home 2, was released on November 10, 2017.

Plot
Mild-mannered radio executive Brad Whitaker tries hard to be a good stepfather to his wife Sara's two children, Megan and Dylan, and is seemingly sterile after an accident to his testicles some years ago. The kids are finally getting closer to him: Dylan confides in him about some older bullies at school and Megan asks him to take her to the father/daughter dance at her school.

One night, Dusty Mayron, Sara's ex and the kids' biological father, calls discovering Sara's married to Brad, and announces he will be visiting the next day. She hesitates to let him into their home, but Brad convinces her it is important for the kids to see their father and stepfather establish a respectful relationship.

When Dusty arrives, he immediately intimidates Brad by his tough and muscular appearance and his charm with Megan and Dylan. He talks Brad into letting him stay, despite Sara warning about his true nature. Brad soon wises up when it becomes clear he intends to drive Brad out of his kids' lives and reconcile with Sara. After Dusty shows him up repeatedly - getting the kids a dog, finishing a treehouse Brad had been building with Dylan, he makes Brad seem racist after unwillingly firing handyman Griffin after a fiasco with Dusty's motorcycle.

Dusty tries to drive a wedge between Brad and Sara by taking them to a fertility doctor, hoping that Brad's inability to impregnate her will send her back into Dusty's arms. Still, the two men appear to reach an understanding after working together to teach Dylan how to defend himself. Additionally, the couple is overjoyed to learn that Brad's sperm count has increased significantly, giving them hope of having a child together.

However, Brad is stunned when Dusty reveals that he still intends to drive him out of the family. Desperate, Brad spends tens of thousands of dollars on early Christmas gifts, including a pony and $18,000 tickets to an NBA match. At the game, Dusty once again shows him up by revealing himself to be friends with the coach of Dylan's favorite team, the Los Angeles Lakers, and an enraged Brad begins drinking heavily.

During half-time, Brad is chosen to try to shoot a basketball to win a prize. Drunk, he goes on a rant about Dusty before accidentally pelting a New Orleans Pelicans cheerleader and a disabled child in a wheelchair in the face with basketballs. Humiliated, Brad moves out of the house; however, when Dusty tries to comfort Sara, she rejects him, and forces him to step up as a dad to help his kids with their busy schedules.

Four days later, Brad is living in his office at work, depressed. Dusty, meanwhile, is overwhelmed by the responsibilities of being a full-time father. When Dusty decides to call it quits and leave on the day of Megan's father-daughter dance, his friend Griff convinces Brad to fight for his family. Finding Dusty at a bar, he tries to get him to come back. Dusty admits that he cannot handle the hard parts about being a father, and admires Brad for putting up with everything. Brad says that all of the terrible parts about being a dad are worth it, because in the end he is doing it for his kids. This convinces Dusty to go to the dance, and they arrive together.

There, they discover that the classmate who was picking on Dylan at school is a girl named Serendipity. They almost fight her father when Dylan physically retaliates, doing what Brad and Dusty taught him to do earlier in the movie, when they were under the impression that the bully was male. However, Dusty finally decides to follow Brad's lead on being a father, and instead quells the fight by starting a dance-off. Brad and Sara reconcile, and Dusty decides to stay and be a good "co-dad" to his kids.

One-year later, the whole family is happy; Brad and Sara have a new baby boy named after Griffin, and Megan and Dylan have finally accepted Brad as their stepfather. Dusty now has a job as a Panda DJ, becomes wealthy through his work, has moved in across the street in a castle he built there, and he and Brad are now friends.

Dusty remarries to Karen, who has a daughter Adrianna, thus Dusty becomes a stepfather himself. Sara is immediately intimidated by her; she feels Karen's looks surpass hers and she is jealous of the latter's professions as a doctor and a novelist. In an ironic twist of fate, Dusty is now in exactly the same position that he put Brad in a year ago – visibly intimidated by his stepdaughter's more muscular father, Roger.

The Cast

 Will Ferrell as Brad Whitaker the stepfather  
 Mark Wahlberg as Dusty Mayron the rivaling father
 Linda Cardellini as Sara Whitaker
 Scarlett Estevez as Megan Mayron
 Owen Vaccaro as Dylan Mayron
 Thomas Haden Church as Leo Holt
 Hannibal Buress as Griff
 Bobby Cannavale as Dr. Emilio Francisco
 Bill Burr as Jerry
 Jamie Denbo as Doris
 Alessandra Ambrosio as Karen
 Didi Costine as Adrianna
 John Cena as Roger (cameo)
 Mark L. Young as Dental hygienist
 Paul Scheer as DJ "The Whip"
 Billy Slaughter as Man in Squidward tie
 Chris Henchy as Jason Sinclair / Panda DJ
 Reba Elizabeth Carston as Serendipity
 LaMonica Garrett as Marco
 Kobe Bryant as himself (cameo)

Production

Casting
On November 5, 2014, it was confirmed that Will Ferrell and Mark Wahlberg would play the lead roles in the film. On November 12, Linda Cardellini joined the cast of the film, to play Ferrell's character's wife. On November 18, Hannibal Buress joined the film to play a sarcastic handyman. On January 28, 2015, Paul Scheer was added to the cast of the film, playing The Whip, a crazy DJ.

Filming
Principal photography began on November 17, 2014, in New Orleans, Louisiana. On November 24 and 25, filming took place at Edward Hynes Charter School. On January 12, 2015, actors were spotted filming in the Lakeview area. On January 21, 2015, a scene was shot during a New Orleans Pelicans and Los Angeles Lakers game where Ferrell smashed a cheerleader (played by stuntwoman/wrestler Taryn Terrell) in the face with a basketball. Tony Hawk was the stunt double for Ferrell in a skateboarding scene, who got hurt on the set. Filming was scheduled to wrap on February 3, 2015, but lasted through February 6.

Release
The film premiered in the UK on December 9, 2015 and was theatrically released in the UK on Boxing Day, December 26, 2015 by Paramount Pictures.

Home media
Daddy's Home was released digitally on March 8, 2016, before being released on Blu-ray and DVD on March 22, 2016.

Reception

Box office
Daddy's Home grossed $150.4 million in North America and $92.4 million in other territories for a worldwide total of $242.8 million, against a budget of $69 million. It is Ferrell's highest-grossing live-action film, surpassing Elf ($220.4 million).

In the United States and Canada, the film opened on December 25, 2015 alongside Point Break, Joy, Concussion, and the wide release of The Big Short. In its opening weekend the film was projected to gross $20–25 million from 3,271 theaters. However, after grossing $1.2 million from its early Thursday showings and $15.7m on its opening day, weekend projections were increased to $43–46 million. The film ended up grossing $38.7 million in its opening weekend, finishing second at the box office behind Star Wars: The Force Awakens ($149.2 million). It was the second biggest non-animated opening of Ferrell's career, behind Talladega Nights: The Ballad of Ricky Bobby ($47 million).

Critical response
On review aggregation website Rotten Tomatoes, Daddy's Home has an approval rating of 30% based on 123 reviews and an average rating of 4.9/10. The site's critical consensus reads, "Will Ferrell and Mark Wahlberg have proven comedic chemistry, but Daddy's Home suffers from a dearth of genuinely funny ideas – and lacks enough guts or imagination to explore the satirical possibilities of its premise." On Metacritic, the film has a score of 42 out of 100, based on 30 critics, indicating "mixed or average reviews". Audiences polled by CinemaScore gave the film an average grade of "B+" on an A+ to F scale.

Accolades
Will Ferrell was nominated for a Teen Choice Award in the category Choice Movie Actor in a Comedy.
Daddy’s Home was nominated a Kid’s Choice Award in the category Favorite Movie while Will Ferrell won the award in the category Favorite Movie Actor.

Sequel

In April 2016, a sequel was announced with Will Ferrell and Mark Wahlberg reprising their characters. Anders and John Morris wrote the script and Anders directed. In January 2017, Paramount Pictures courted Mel Gibson and John Lithgow to star in the sequel. The two were later confirmed to star in the film. Linda Cardellini, Owen Vaccaro and Scarlett Estevez also reprise their roles. John Cena reprised his role as Roger. It was released on November 10, 2017.

In an interview, Mark Wahlberg mentioned that they would like to get Liam Neeson for the third installment of the film.

References

External links

 
 
 
 

2015 films
American buddy comedy films
2010s buddy comedy films
Films about dysfunctional families
Films directed by Sean Anders
Films produced by Adam McKay
Films produced by John Morris
Films produced by Will Ferrell
Films scored by Michael Andrews
Films shot in New Orleans
Gary Sanchez Productions films
Red Granite Pictures films
Paramount Pictures films
Films with screenplays by John Morris
Films with screenplays by Sean Anders
2015 comedy films
Masculinity
Films about parenting
2010s English-language films
2010s American films